Wayne McDade (born 1 July 1981) is a former Samoa international rugby league footballer who played as a .

Background
McDade was born in New Zealand.

Playing career
A Richmond Bulldogs junior, McDade has appeared in the NSWRL Premier League for the North Sydney Bears, and the Auckland Lions. In 2008 he was contracted to the New Zealand Warriors but did not play a first grade game. McDade has since played for the Mt Albert Lions and Auckland Vulcans.

Representative career
McDade was named in the Samoa squad for the 2008 Rugby League World Cup, and played in two matches.

References

External links

Richmond Bulldogs profile

1981 births
Living people
New Zealand rugby league players
Richmond Bulldogs players
Auckland rugby league team players
North Sydney Bears NSW Cup players
Mount Albert Lions players
Samoa national rugby league team players
New Zealand sportspeople of Samoan descent
New Zealand people of Niuean descent
Rugby league props